Standard Motor Products of India Limited otherwise known as Stampro for short, formerly known as Union Motors , was an Indian automobile manufacturer based in Chennai which produced Standard cars and light commercial vehicles in collaboration with Standard-Triumph of England. The company was established in 1948 and was in operation till 1988.

Early History
Standard Motor Products of India , then known as STAMPRO was established by C. V. Karthick Narayanan, grandson of C. P. Ramaswami Aiyar.It was a joint venture between Union Motors India and Standard Motor Company in United Kingdom to assembly Standard range of cars in India. The factory was set up at then outskirts of Chennai, at Perungalathur, east of Tambaram in 1948.

Production models

Vanguard and Standard models 

The first car to roll out from this facility in 1951 was the Standard Vanguard Phase I Saloon. Later the compact 1953 model Standard Eight were launched followed by 1954 Standard Ten. In late fifties Standard Pennant was launched followed by a station wagon version. Also during the 50's, the larger Standard Vanguard Phase III Saloon was also offered side by side.

Standard Atlas and 20
In the 1960s the company launched the Standard Atlas commercial Van. This model was changed slightly for the Indian market and redesigned as panel van as well as passenger van and was sold as a Standard 20 which continued well into 1980s. Later versions offered a pickup version as well as a passenger version.

Standard Herald 
During the mid-1950s following the drop in sales for Standard and Vanguard models, the Triumph name was used for upcoming models and the Triumph Herald was relaunched in India as Standard Herald. The Indian model had four-door version and used the engine from the earlier Standard models.

Standard Gazel 
In the mid-1970s Standard Motors India launched the Standard Gazel model, which was developed in-house based on the Standard Herald model. But soon the sales dropped to such a dismal low that the company stopped production and continued with its Standard Atlas vans and pickups.

Standard 2000 

In the mid-1980s the central government relaxed the investment regulations and Tariff Commission regulations and allowed all Indian automobile companies to have a technical tie-up with foreign counterparts. SMPL once again sought the collaboration with its old partner now under Rover group. The 1976 Rover SD1 was launched in India in 1985 as Standard 2000 and was priced at the premium end. The sales dropped when customers complained that the 1950s Vanguard powered Rover wasn't quick enough and was a notorious gas guzzler. Soon the company became near bankrupt and was taken over by A.C. Muthiah group.

Further BIFR intervention in investments and consolidation of commercial vans segment did not help the company and in the late 1990s the company ceased operations. In 2005 the company was liquidated and the land sold to Shriram Chits group. The space is today an IT office park named Shriram The Gateway Office Park in Perugalathur.

Further reading
 - SMPIL Land - Business Line
 - Standards in India - Book:The Book of the Standard Motor Company By Graham Robson

 - Standard Motors, Heralding ‘Make in India’ - The Hindu

References

Car manufacturers of India
Manufacturing companies based in Chennai
Indian companies disestablished in 1988
Defunct motor vehicle manufacturers of India
Standard Motor Company
Indian companies established in 1947
Vehicle manufacturing companies disestablished in 1988
Vehicle manufacturing companies established in 1947